Pratap is a 1993 Indian Tamil-language action film written, directed and produced by Arjun. The film stars him, Khushbu, Janagaraj, Devan and Rocky Rajesh. It was released on 16 April 1993.

Plot

Cast 
Arjun as Pratap
Khushbu as Anjali
Janagaraj as Rajappa
Devan as Michael Raj
Rocky Rajesh as Alex Raj
J. D. Chakravarthy as Vimal Raj
Anju as Priya

Soundtrack 
The music was composed by Maragathamani, with lyrics by Vairamuthu. For the Telugu dubbed version Muta Rowdy, all lyrics were written by Rajasri.

Release and reception 
Pratap was released on 16 April 1993. The Indian Express wrote the film "is tailormade for Arjun".

References

External links 
 

1990s Tamil-language films
1993 action films
1993 films
Films directed by Arjun Sarja
Films scored by M. M. Keeravani
Indian action films